The Patsy is a 1964 American comedy film directed by and starring Jerry Lewis. It was released on August 12, 1964, by Paramount Pictures.

Plot
A famous comedian perishes in a plane crash. Members of his management team, worried that they will be jobless, decide to find someone to take his place as their "meal ticket". Stanley Belt is a bellboy at their hotel and they decide he will become their next star.

Stanley has no obvious talent, but his new managers use their power to open doors for him, including an appearance on The Ed Sullivan Show. It quickly appears that Stanley will never develop any talent and the managers fire him just before he goes on stage. However, one of them, Ellen, has fallen in love with Stanley and stays by his side.

Stanley becomes a hit on the show. The others from the management team come begging for their jobs back, and Stanley magnanimously agrees.

Cast
 Jerry Lewis as Stanley Belt
 Everett Sloane as Caryl Fergusson
 Phil Harris as Chic Wymore
 Keenan Wynn as Harry Silver
 Peter Lorre as Morgan Heywood
 John Carradine as Bruce Alden
 Ina Balin as Ellen Betz
 The Four Step Brothers as Themselves

This film contains cameos from a variety of Hollywood personalities including George Raft, Hedda Hopper, Ed Sullivan, Ed Wynn, Mel Tormé, Rhonda Fleming, Scatman Crothers, Phil Foster, Billy Beck, Hans Conried, Richard Deacon, Del Moore, Neil Hamilton, Buddy Lester, Nancy Kulp, Norman Alden, Jack Albertson, Richard Bakalyan, Jerry Dunphy, Kathleen Freeman, Norman Leavitt, Eddie Ryder, Lloyd Thaxton and Fritz Feld.

In addition, Bill Richmond, who co-wrote the screenplay with Lewis, makes a cameo appearance in The Patsy as a piano player.

This was Peter Lorre's final film. He died in March 1964 prior to its release. This film and Lewis's The Disorderly Orderly, released a few months apart, were the final screen appearances of actor Everett Sloane.

Production
The film's working title was Son of Bellboy, as it was originally intended to be a sequel to The Bellboy. Lewis' characters in both films are bellboys named Stanley.  It was filmed from January 6 to February 28, 1964.

Re-release
The Patsy was re-released on a double bill with another Jerry Lewis film, The Nutty Professor, in 1967.

Reception
On Rotten Tomatoes, the film holds an 82% rating based on 11 reviews, with an average rating of 6.25/10.

Home media
The Patsy was released on DVD on October 12, 2004, July 15, 2014 in a 4-film collection, 4 Film Favorites: Jerry Lewis, with The Bellboy, The Errand Boy, and The Ladies Man and September 7, 2020.

References

External links
 
 
 
 
 

1964 films
1964 comedy films
1960s English-language films
Films directed by Jerry Lewis
Films scored by David Raksin
Films with screenplays by Jerry Lewis
Films with screenplays by Bill Richmond (writer)
American comedy films
1960s American films